Numerous incidents of deaths and violence have occurred at Cecil Hotel in Los Angeles. Originally opened as a middle-class hotel on December 20, 1924, in Downtown Los Angeles, it eventually became a budget hotel, hostel, and rooming house. Its reputation is due to at least 16 sudden or unexplained deaths that have occurred in or around the hotel.

In 2011, the hotel's name was changed to "Stay on Main" in an effort to distance the establishment from its past.

Timeline of incidents

See also
 List of reportedly haunted locations
 List of reportedly haunted locations in the United States
 Crime Scene: The Vanishing at the Cecil Hotel
 H. H. Holmes

Notes

References

External links
 The Cecil Hotel Has Been Dubbed "A Hotbed For Death" — Here Are 16 Scary Facts About The Establishment

Death in the United States-related lists